Secret Story 10 is the tenth season of the French reality television series Secret Story, a show which is based loosely on the international Big Brother format. On November 3, 2015,  NT1 and Christophe Beaugrand officially confirmed a tenth season.

It was confirmed both daily recaps and live shows air on NT1.

Julien Geloën won the series on Day 84.

House of Secrets 
For the third time, after Secret Story 8 and Secret Story 9, the house is located on the rooftop of the studios of AB Productions which was used in the 1990s where many popular sitcoms were filmed, as Hélène et les Garçons and Premiers baisers. Perched on a building, the House of Secrets offers to the contestants a wide view of Paris.

Housemates

Alexandre
 Alexandre ?? is 30. He is from France. He entered on Day -3 in the "Secret Boat" but he didn't enter Day 1 on the House.

Anaïs
 Anaïs Casumaro is 20. She is from Aubagne, France. She entered on Day 1 in the Main House. She shares a secret with her twin sister Manon, to be the Mistresses of the Identities. They have a special and important secret mission to complete during the first week. She finished in fourth place on Day 84.

Athénaïs
 Athénaïs de Truchis is a 26-year-old hostess in event, from St Germain En Laye, France. She entered on Day 1 in the Main House, and entered as single, she comes from an aristocratic family, she sings, she dances. She was evicted on Day 28.

Bastien
 Bastien Grimal is a 28-year-old New York City, United States. He entered on Day 1 in the Main House. His secret is to be the alibi of Julien's and Sophia's secret, he must create a fake couple with Sophia to protect their secret. Bastien is a player, a seducer, he entered in the house as single, and likes brunettes.

Damien
 Damien Gomes is 24 years old. He is from Nogent-sur-Marne, France. He entered on Day 1, in the Main House. He has a girlfriend but still lives with his parents, he has Portuguese origins, he plays football, he loves making jokes and he once saved his cousin from drowning in a pool. He was evicted on Day 7.

Darko
 Darko Bozovic is 24, from Paris, France. He works as a waiter, he's single, origin Serbian, when he was born his mother was 16 years old, and he stayed 8 years with someone and recently broke up. He pretends to be the best liar in the world. He entered on Day 1 in the Secret Hotel. His secret is : "I'm international star of E-sports". He was evicted on Day 70.

Fanny
 Fanny Rodrigues is 24. She is from Oliveira de Azeméis, Portugal. She originally is from Switzerland but lives in Portugal for 4 years with her fiancé João. Her family is her strength, she shares everything with her fiancé João and she loves fashion and has a clothing store. Very playful and combative, she hopes to be a finalist of Secret Story 10, in France. She entered on Day 1 in the Main House. Her secret is : "I already participated twice to Secret Story". She was evicted on Day 63.

Jaja
 Jawad Moussaoui is 23. He is from Paris, France. Jaja works as a hairdresser, he is single and eats all day. He falls in love very fast, example : just with a simple Facebook message. He is funny and is Ch'ti. He entered on Day -3 in the "Secret Boat" and entered on Day 1 in the Secret Hotel. His secret is : "Three winners of Secret Story chose me to enter the House of Secrets". He shares this secret with Sarah. He was evicted on Day 35.

Julien
 Julien Geloën is 23. He is from Cannes, France. Julien is a D.J. He entered on Day 1 in the Main House, his secret is : "We are a couple" with Sophia. He became the winner on Day 84.

Liam
 Léa ?? is 22. She is from Saint-Tropez, France. She entered on Day -3 in the "Secret Boat" but she didn't enter Day 1 on the House.

Maeva
 Maeva Pellerin is a 24-years-old commercial communication advisor from Nantes, France. She is a professional dancer, she is smart, stubborn, when she was 12, she learned the identity of her real father. She entered on Day 1 in the Main House. She was evicted on Day 42.

Manon
 Manon Casumaro is 20. She is from Aubagne, France. She shares a secret with her twin sister Anaïs, to be the Mistresses of the Identities. They have a special and important secret mission to complete during the first week. She was evicted on Day 49.

Marvin
 Marvin Tillière is 22. He is from Paris, France. Marvin works as a trainer, since he is 10, he has no contact with his father. He entered on Day 1 in the Main House. His secret is : "I've got the keys of the House's mailbox". He was ejected on Day 39.

Mélanie
 Mélanie Dedigama is a 26-years-old model from Genève, Switzerland. She likes dance and theatre, she defines herself as funny, smart, and she prefers to be around beautiful girls than the others. She entered on Day 1 in the Secret Hotel. She finished in third place on Day 84.

Pierre
 Pierre Abena is a 26 year old model and actor from Paris who lives in Los Angeles. He is the son of an Italian mother and a Cameroonian father. Pierre has two sisters in Paris and has a long-term girlfriend. Before his modelling career he was a professional basketball player in France. As for acting he was in the movie "The Perfect Match"in 2016.

Sarah
 Sarah Lopez is 25, from Livry-Gargan, France. She works as a hostess in a tanning center. Her parents are divorced and she lives with her mother. She entered on Day -3 in the "Secret Boat" and entered Day 1 in the Secret Hotel. She shares a secret with Jaja, her secret is : "Three winners of Secret Story chose me to enter the House of Secrets". She was evicted on Day 78.

Sophia
 Sophia Lazare is 31. She is from Cannes, France. She is a dancer. She entered on Day 1 in the Main House. Her secret is : "We are a couple", with Julien. As a way to protect this secret, she has the first week to fake a beginning of romance with Bastien. She was evicted on Day 14.

Thomas
 Thomas Beatie is 42 years old. He is from Phoenix, United States. He is a writer and a lecturer. He entered on Day 1 in the Main House. His secret is : "I'm the first pregnant man ever". He finished as the runner up on Day 84.

Secrets

Nominations

Notes 
:  In round one of nominations, the Main House housemates fail to identify the identities of the Secret Hotel housemates, therefore Anaïs and Manon are saved and must pre-nominate six housemates : Damien, Pierre, Maeva, Mélanie, Sophia and Thomas. The six pre-nominees were facing a game in which Maeva and Sophia were saved, letting Damien, Mélanie, Pierre and Thomas face eviction.
:  In round two of nominations, male housemates nominate female housemates. Following the passage of the boys in the confessional, Manon, Sophia and Mélanie arrive ex aequo in the votes. But the power of the Mistresses of the Identities, Manon and Anaïs, allows the twins to replace Julien's vote by the girls of their choice, to avoid to Manon to be nominated. They replaced his vote by Mélanie and Sophia.
:  In round three of nominations, female housemates nominate male housemates. Anaïs and Manon decided not to use their power to steal an identity.
:  In round four of nominations, all the housemates were able to nominate and be nominated except Darko, Julien and Julien because they were currently up for eviction. 
:  Fanny, Mélanie and Sarah can espace the nomination by challenging some of the housemates to give in to temptation. They put Jaja face the temptation, he yielded to the temptation by agreeing to see a message from his family which automatically provides a switch card that will allow one of the nominees to escape the nomination.
:  Fanny, Mélanie and Sarah put Darko face the temptation for winning a place in the semi-final. Darko has agreed to receive the place in the semifinals which automatically provides a second switch card to the three nominees.
:  In round six of nominations (week 5), female housemates nominate male housemates. Anaïs and Manon decided to use their power as the Mistresses of the Identities and replaced Sarah's vote by Thomas and Jaja.

Nominations : Results

References

External links
  Official website for Secret Story
  Social network page for Secret Story
 Big brother news site

10
2016 French television seasons